Mason's Manual of Legislative Procedure, commonly referred to as Mason's Manual, is the official parliamentary authority of most state legislatures in the United States. This 700+ page book has been "Adopted as the authority on questions of parliamentary law and procedure in California, it is to legislatures what Robert's Rules of Order is to club groups. Gleaned from court decisions and legislative precedents, salted by practical experience, it is... [used] by legislatures throughout the U.S. and its territories."

The Manual covers motions, procedures, vote requirements, etc. applicable to legislatures. It includes the rules of order, principles, precedents, and legal basis behind parliamentary law.

The author, Paul Mason (1898–1985), was a scholar who worked for the California State Senate. He is best known for writing Constitutional History of California in 1951 and Manual of Legislative Procedure in 1935.

The National Conference of State Legislatures (NCSL) was assigned copyright ownership by Paul Mason prior to his death. The NCSL assigned the American Society of Legislative Clerks and Secretaries (ASLCS) the task of editing and maintaining the manual for future printings. In 1984, the ASLCS created the Mason's Manual Revision Commission consisting of ASLCS members. It is responsible for editing and revising the manual to keep pace with the modern challenges and developments in parliamentary procedures.

The most recent edition is the 2020 edition.

Footnotes

External links
1979 Edition - Internet Archive
The Advantages of Mason's Manual for Legislative Bodies
Mason's Manual of Legislative Procedure-Info Google Books

Parliamentary procedure
Parliamentary authority